John McLeod (September 20, 1833 – March 9, 1879) was an Ontario businessman and political figure. He represented Durham West in the Legislative Assembly of Ontario as a Liberal member from 1867 to 1871 and from 1872 to 1879.

Biography
He was born in Lancaster Township in Upper Canada in 1833, the son of Scottish immigrants, and grew up there, later settling in Bowmanville. He served as warden for the United Counties of Northumberland and Durham. He was a director of the Bowmanville Furniture Manufacturing Company. He was reelected in 1872 by acclamation after Edward Blake resigned to retain his seat in the Canadian House of Commons. He died on March 9, 1879, at Bowmanville.

References

External links 

The Canadian parliamentary companion and annual register, 1873, HJ Morgan

1833 births
1879 deaths
Canadian people of Scottish descent
Ontario Liberal Party MPPs
People from Clarington